The Austin Film Critics Association Award for Best Animated Film is an annual award given by the Austin Film Critics Association, honoring the best in animated filmmaking.

Winners
 † = Winner of the Academy Award

2000s

2010s

2020s

Nominees

2019
Frozen II
Klaus
Missing Link
Toy Story 4

2021
Belle
Flee 
Encanto - Byron Howard and Jared Bush
Luca
Sources:

Multiple winners
Pete Docter - 2
Lee Unkrich - 2

References

Austin Film Critics Association Awards
Awards for best animated feature film
Lists of films by award